Leucadendron conicum, the garden route conebush, is a flower-bearing shrub that belongs to the genus  Leucadendron  and part of the fynbos form. The plant is native to the Western Cape and the Eastern Cape, where it occurs in the Langeberg, Outeniqua Mountains, Tsitsikamma Mountains, Elandsberg and Garden Route plain.The shrub grows to be 6 m and bears flowers from October to November.

The tree is number 78.1 on the National List of Indigenous Trees in South Africa.

Gallery

References 

conicum